Thomas Jerome Emanski (born February 1948) is an American baseball coach and former Major League scout. He is best known for his coaching instructional videos, whose advertisements were ubiquitous on ESPN in the late 1990s.

Early life
Emanski grew up in the Scranton/Wilkes-Barre region of northeastern Pennsylvania. After high school, he moved to Florida, where he worked assembling mainframe computers for IBM while coaching youth baseball and football.

Coaching and scouting career
By the early 1980s, Emanski was well-known in Florida baseball circles, running coaching seminars and studying the mechanics of baseball using techniques he had learned at IBM. In 1986, he opened Baseball World, a youth baseball school in Maitland, Florida, where he tested his methods on his students. His teams found success, winning back-to-back-to-back Amateur Athletic Union (AAU) national youth championships in three divisions: 12 and under (1990), 13 and under/under '90 (1991), and 11 and under (1992). Emanski also coached the 1996 Junior Pan American team to two wins against Cuba and the gold medal.

From the mid-1980s to the mid-1990s, Emanski worked as a scout for the New York Yankees, Pittsburgh Pirates, and Houston Astros.

Instructional videos
In 1986, Emanski produced his first instructional video, Mechanics of the Major League Swing. More titles followed, which were advertised on television in select regional markets, such as Houston and Florida, and sold well. The commercials featured youth players running Emanski's drills, the use of which produced "back-to-back-to-back AAU national championship teams." The advertisements also featured endorsements from Fred McGriff, recorded in a single day in 1991, whose swing Emanski had analyzed when the slugger was in the minor leagues. In 2021, McGriff admitted on Kenny Mayne's final ESPN show that he had never seen Emanski's defensive drills video. In 1997, Emanski struck a deal with ESPN to advertise his videos, with the network receiving as much as a third of each sale. The commercials ran on ESPN from June 14, 1997 to January 2, 2007; a 2014 profile of Emanski estimated the commercials had run at least 50,000 times during that span.

The frequent commercial airings made the Emanski videos fodder for sports analysts lampooning a lack of fundamental play in professional baseball players. For example, Jayson Stark said the St. Louis Cardinals' poor defensive display in the 2002 National League Championship Series "[wouldn't] be recommended by Tom Emanski." A 2005 New York Times article suggested that New York Yankees third baseman Alex Rodriguez spend $29.95 and "buy the eminent baseball instructor Tom Emanski's DVD, Teaching the Mechanics of the Major League Swing II."

List of Emanski videos
 Mechanics of the Major League Swing
 Dynamic Practice Organization
 Defensive Drills
 Defensive Strategies 101
 Mechanics of the Major League Catcher
 Mechanics of the Major League Pitcher
 Baseball Strength & Conditioning
 Major League Baserunner
 Professional Bunting
 Mechanics of the Major League Swing II

References

1948 births
Living people